The Agutaynen language is spoken on Agutaya Island in the province of Palawan in the Philippines.

Distribution
Caabay & Melvin (2014: 1-2) note that Agutaynen is spoken by about 15,000 people on Agutaya Island and six of the smaller of the smaller Cuyo Islands, namely Diit, Maracañao, Matarawis, Algeciras, Concepcion, and Quiniluban. After World War II, Agutaynen speakers were also moved to San Vicente, Roxas, Brooke’s Point, Balabac, Linapacan, and Puerto Princesa City municipalities on Palawan Island.

Phonology

Consonants

Vowels 

Grammar

Pronouns
The following set of pronouns are the pronouns found in the Agutaynen language. Note: the direct/nominative case is divided between full and short forms.

References

Bibliography
 Quakenbush, J. Stephen, comp. 1999. "Agutaynen texts. Studies in Agutaynen, Part I". In: Studies in Philippine Languages and Cultures 11 (1): 7–88. available online from SIL

Further reading 
 Quakenbush, J. Stephen. Tracking Agutaynen language vitality: 1984-2009. Paper presented at 11th International Conference on Austronesian Linguistics, Aussois, France in 2009. Available at SIL. Access date: 26 December, 2022.

External links
Agutaynen-English Dictionary online dictionary (SIL Philippines)

Languages of Palawan
Calamian languages